Tangguoa is a small genus of east Asian cellar spiders. It was first described by Z. Y. Yao, Y. P. Luo and S. Q. Li in 2021, and it has only been found in China.  it contains only two species: T. laibin and T. tongguling.

See also
 List of Pholcidae species

References

Pholcidae genera
Spiders of China